This is an incomplete list of military and other armed confrontations that have occurred within the boundaries of the modern US State of North Dakota since European contact. The region was part of the Viceroyalty of New Spain from 1535 to 1679, New France from 1679 to 1803, and part of the United States of America 1803–present.

The Plains Indian Wars directly affected the region during westward expansion.  The Dakota War of 1862 (also known as the Sioux Uprising) involved eastern Dakota Native Americans, the armed conflicts of this war were fought in Minnesota, their former lands. The aftermath of that war was the pursuit of several eastern Dakota tribes in both South Dakota and North Dakota.

Battles

Notes

See also
 History of North Dakota
 Plains Indians Wars

Battles
North Dakota
Battles in North Dakota
History of North Dakota
Military history of North Dakota